Razboyna (also written Razboina, Razboïna; or Разбойна in Cyrillic) may refer to:

 In Bulgaria:
 Razboyna, Burgas Province - a village in Ruen municipality, Burgas Province
 Razboyna, Targovishte Province - a village in Targovishte municipality, Targovishte Province